Dániel Sallói (born 19 July 1996) is a Hungarian professional footballer who plays as a striker and winger for Major League Soccer club Sporting Kansas City and the Hungary national team.

Club career

Youth
Sallói worked his way through the youth ranks of Nemzeti Bajnokság I club Újpest FC in his home town of Budapest, Hungary beginning in 2005. He was a member of the U16, U17, and U21 sides between 2011 and 2014. He was named the U16 and U17 academy Player of the Year during his one season with each team. For the 2013/14 season, the U21 team claimed second place in Hungary's U21 championship with Sallói as a member.  In 2014, he traveled to the United States as a foreign exchange student and attended Blue Valley Northwest High School in Overland Park, Kansas. At that time he joined the U18 academy of Sporting Kansas City of Major League Soccer coached by fellow Hungarian and friend of his father István Urbányi. During the 2014/15 academy season, he scored a team-high 21 goals in 28 appearances, including three hat-tricks.

Professional
In July 2015, Sallói returned to his former club by signing for the first team of Újpest FC, although on an amateur contract. He made his professional debut on 18 July 2015, a day before his 19th birthday. He scored his first professional league goal exactly one week later in a 3-1 victory over Vasas SC. He also made four appearances for the club in the Magyar Kupa, scoring six goals in the competition. In total, he scored seven goals and four assists in sixteen matches in all competitions. In league play, he scored one goal in twelve appearances.

On 13 January 2016, it was announced that Sallói had returned to Sporting Kansas City, signing a professional, first-team contract and becoming the club's fourth all-time homegrown player. He was eligible to be a HGP because of his residence in the area and because he had played for the club's academy team.

Prior to the 2016 Major League Soccer season, Sallói was loaned to Sporting's reserve side, Swope Park Rangers. In total, he scored four goals in ten league appearances during the loan. In June 2016, it was announced that he would return to Hungary for a year-long loan at Vasas. However after only the first match of the season, the loan was switched to newly promoted Gyirmót who was coached by István Urbányi, Sallói's former coach at the Sporting Kansas City Academy.

After appearing with the reserve team in 2016, Sallói was a rotational piece in Sporting's front line in 2017, starting 12 and appearing in 22 regular season MLS matches, mostly as a winger. Sallói scored three goals and assisted two in league play. Sallói was also a heavy contributor in Sporting's 2017 Open Cup championship run, scoring the winning goal in the 2017 Open Cup final against the New York Red Bulls off a through ball from midfielder Benny Feilhaber.

Sallói became the starting left winger for Sporting through the 2018 season, helping KC finish atop the Western Conference. Sallói scored 11 goals and assisted 7 times in regular season play, with an additional three goals in the 2018 MLS Playoffs. Through 2019 and 2020, Sallói entered a scoring slump, scoring one goal in 35 league appearances through both seasons. 

Sallói rebounded in 2021, helping Sporting reach 3rd place in the West. Sallói finished with 16 goals and 8 assists and was named a finalist for the Landon Donovan MLS MVP Award.

International career
Sallói was a member of Hungary's national U18 side from 2013-2014. He was a member of the U18 squad for the Václav Ježek Tournament in 2013 and debuted for the U18 team during the tournament during a 1–0 victory over Ukraine. The team won the bronze medal in the tournament after beating the Czech Republic 5–4 on penalties in the 3rd place match in which Sallói came on as a 46th-minute substitute. On 16 March 2014, he appeared in a friendly draw against Gibraltar as part of the team's preparation for the 2014 UEFA European Under-19 Championship. However, he was not named to the squad for the tournament because of travel restrictions on his visa while he lived in the United States. He has also trained with the national U21 team.

He made his debut for the Hungary national football team on 2 September 2021 in a World Cup qualifier against England, a 0–4 home loss. He substituted Roland Sallai in the 66th minute.

Personal life
Sallói was born in Siófok, Hungary and was raised in Budapest. He is the son of former professional footballer and Hungarian international and current sporting director István Sallói. His father István had been a teammate of Sporting Kansas City manager Peter Vermes at Győri ETO FC.

In April 2019, Sallói earned a U.S. green card which qualifies him as a domestic player for MLS roster purposes.

Career statistics

Honors
Individual
MLS All-Star: 2021
Sporting Kansas City Golden Boot: 2018, 2021
Sporting Kansas City
U.S. Open Cup: 2017
Western Conference (regular season): 2018, 2020

References

External links

USSDA profile

1996 births
Living people
Association football forwards
Expatriate soccer players in the United States
Gyirmót FC Győr players
Homegrown Players (MLS)
Hungarian expatriate footballers
Hungarian expatriate sportspeople in the United States
Hungarian footballers
Hungary youth international footballers
Hungary under-21 international footballers
Hungary international footballers
Major League Soccer players
Nemzeti Bajnokság I players
Sporting Kansas City players
Footballers from Budapest
Sporting Kansas City II players
Újpest FC players
USL Championship players
Vasas SC players